Spin the Wheel is an American trivia and strategy game show that premiered on Fox on June 20, 2019. The show's producers scout for Good Samaritans to reward with a chance to earn up to $23 million per episode.

Gameplay
The game is played in four rounds, with the contestant receiving four spins per round of a giant vertical roulette wheel divided into 48 sections. The first three rounds involve answering multiple-choice trivia questions in various fields of pop culture or general knowledge. The goal is to accumulate money in a bank, with a floor of $0.

Round 1: Quickspin
On each of the four turns, the contestant spins the wheel and is asked a question with two answer choices while it is in motion. They have ten seconds to answer; once the wheel stops, the value of the spin is added to the bank for a correct answer or deducted for a miss. The maximum value on the wheel is $500,000, allowing the contestant to bank up to $2 million.

Round 2: Quickspin +
This round follows the same format as Quickspin, but with three answer choices per question. A friend or family member is also brought onstage and given control of a button, which they secretly may press during the contestant's ten-second answer time to double the value of the spin. The button may be used on any or all of the four questions, allowing the contestant to bank up to $4 million.

Round 3: Build Your Wheel
Two spaces each of $1 million and "Back to Zero" are placed on the wheel, the latter wiping out the entire bank if they are hit, and penalty spaces of up to $200,000 are added as well. The wheel now displays four sets of four low-value spaces each ($1 to $1,000), which the contestant may try to change during this round. After seeing the first few words of a question, they choose one of four amounts to play for ($250,000, $500,000, $1 million, or $2 million); each value may only be used once. The entire question is then asked, with four answer choices. A correct answer allows the contestant to apply the chosen amount to one set of low-value spaces, either placing all of it on one space or spreading it evenly across two or more. A miss turns some of the spaces into "Back to Zero" - one to four, in ascending order of the chosen values. The contestant then spins the wheel, and the bank is increased or reduced based on the result of the spin. Up to $8 million can be banked, and all changes made to the wheel carry over into the final round.

Depending on the contestant's answers to the questions, the total number of "Back to Zero" spaces on the wheel at the end of this round can range from two to twelve.

Round 4: Final Spins
The contestant's partner is brought back onstage. Before each spin, the host makes a cash offer to quit the game, based on the amount in the bank and the risk of losing. The partner secretly decides whether or not to accept the offer, after which the contestant spins the wheel.

The maximum value of penalty spaces in this round is increased to $500,000, and spaces are added to the wheel as follows:

1st spin: One $1 million space
2nd spin: A second $1 million space and one "Back to Zero"
3rd spin: One $2 million space and two "Back to Zero"
4th spin: One $3 million space and three "Back to Zero"

The game ends after the fourth spin, or after any spin in which the wheel stops on "Back to Zero" or any penalty space greater than or equal to the bank total. The helper's decisions are then revealed. If they have turned down every offer, the contestant receives the final bank total; otherwise, the contestant receives the value of the first accepted offer. Up to $9 million can be banked, for a potential maximum bank of $23 million.

The wheel
The show features a vertical roulette wheel,  in diameter and divided into forty-eight light-emitting diode wedges worth either a dollar amount or “Back to Zero”. In contrast, popular game show The Price Is Rights Big Wheel is 9 feet, 8 inches tall, and Wheel of Fortunes namesake is 16.5 feet wide.

The wedges’ typeface for displaying the dollar amounts is inspired by Federal Reserve Notes from U.S. Currency. The wheel has pegs fashioned from thick metal pipes, which the contestant grips in order to start the rotation. A large, metallic silver ball bounces among the pegs but stays within the wheel's glass-enclosed interior, eventually coming to rest as the wheel stops and determining the outcome of the spin. The wheel is so large that a structural engineer, Fraser Smith of Mendenhall Smith Structural Engineers, was commissioned to design and build it, along with a support system.

Neither the wheel nor the game are fixed to have any certain outcome. In 1954, the U.S. Supreme Court ruled in Federal Communications Commission v. American Broadcasting Co., Inc. 347 U.S. 284, that quiz shows were not a form of gambling which paved the way for their introduction to television. In the years that followed a series of quiz show scandals tainted the genre. A formal congressional subcommittee investigation began in  1959. In 1960, Congress amended the Communications Act of 1934 to prohibit the fixing of quiz shows. Spin the Wheel, like all U.S. television quiz shows, is bound not to fix the game by leaking trivia questions or rigging the wheel.

As stated on-air by Dax Shepard, the length and speed of each spin are determined at random. The result of a spin is decided by the first section in which the ball comes to rest for a minimum of five seconds.

Episodes
The show's producers scout for Good Samaritan-type individuals to reward with a chance to earn up to $23 million per episode. Each episode starts with the backstory of who the contestant is and what makes them deserving of a monetary windfall.

Game summaries

Production 
Fox, in an effort to acquire more unscripted shows like Hell’s Kitchen, The Four, and Love Connection, entered a bidding war with multiple networks to obtain Spin in 2017.

Spin the Wheel is the result of three production companies: executive producer Andrew Glassman’s Glassman Media; creative and executive producer Justin Timberlake’s Tennman Entertainment, a 2007 joint venture between Interscope Records and Timberlake; and executive producer Rick Yorn's LBI Entertainment.

Ratings

References

See also
 The Wall (game show)
 Lists of game shows

2010s American game shows
2019 American television series debuts
2019 American television series endings
English-language television shows
Fox Broadcasting Company original programming